is the 9th major single by the Japanese girl idol group S/mileage. It was released in Japan on February 1, 2012 on the label Hachama.

The physical CD single debuted at number 2 in the Oricon daily singles chart.

In the Oricon weekly chart, it debuted at number six.

B-sides 
The B-side of the regular edition is a cover of the song "Namida Girl" by Miki Fujimoto (from her 2003 album Miki 1).

Release 
The single was released in five versions: four limited editions (Limited Editions A, B, C, and  D) and a regular edition.

All the limited editions came with a sealed-in serial-numbered entry card for the lottery to win a ticket to one of the single's launch events.

The corresponding DVD single (so called Single V) was released a week later, on February 8.

Personnel 
S/mileage members: 
 Ayaka Wada
 Kanon Fukuda
 Kana Nakanishi
 Akari Takeuchi
 Rina Katsuta
 Meimi Tamura

Track listing

Regular Edition

Limited Editions A, B, C

Limited Edition D

Charts

Variations 
Sam Kapu is the original performer of this song since 1971 in a relaxing music form and in English language.
On December 1, 1971, it was made by a Girl Group named Golden Half as its cover version, leading to its revival.
Around 1980s, Frances Yip made a revival to this song, which was part of her best album.
On 2005, SexBomb Girls made a Filipino version of this song, as long as it retains the Japanese Title, and its English Phrases. It was also part of their 4th Album, Sumayaw Sumunod: The Best of SexBomb Girls as its 10th track.

References

External links 
 Profile of the CD single on the official website of Hello! Project
 Profile of the CD single on the official website of Up-Front Works
 Profile of the DVD single on the official website of Hello! Project

2012 singles
Japanese-language songs
Angerme songs
Songs written by Tsunku
Song recordings produced by Tsunku
2012 songs